Vanu Gopala Menon (born September 8, 1960) became the Permanent Representative of Singapore to the United Nations on September 16, 2004, a position he held until August 2011. As an Ambassador Extraordinary and Plenipotentiary, Menon is the personal representative of the President of Singapore.

Menon was educated at the National University of Singapore, taking a Bachelor's degree in Business Administration in 1985.  He then joined the Ministry of Foreign Affairs, serving as First Secretary at Singapore's UN mission in New York (March 1988 – April 1991).  Returning to study on a Raffles Scholarship at the London School of Economics, he was awarded a Master of Science in International Relations in 1994.  Menon then served in the Singapore High Commission in Kuala Lumpur, Malaysia (November 1994 – November 1997).  On his return to Singapore, he joined the Policy, Planning and Analysis Directorate of the Ministry, rising to become its Director (December 1998 – October 2001).  He left that position for Geneva where he represented Singapore to the UN, whilst also serving as Singapore's Ambassador to Turkey (December 2001 – August 2004).

Menon is married to Mrs Jayanthi Menon and they have a son.

References

1960 births
Living people
Permanent Representatives of Singapore to the United Nations
High Commissioners of Singapore to Malaysia
Ambassadors of Singapore to Turkey